Agylla dentifera is a moth of the family Erebidae. It was described by George Hampson in 1900. It is found in Ecuador.

References

Moths described in 1900
dentifera
Moths of South America